The CASBY Awards were a Canadian awards ceremony for independent and alternative music, presented annually by Toronto, Ontario radio station CFNY, currently branded as 102.1 The Edge. CASBY is an acronym for Canadian Artists Selected By You.

The awards were first presented in 1981 under the name U-Knows, a pun on Canada's mainstream Juno Awards. The concept was developed by David Marsden, the program director at CFNY at the time, when he heard the Juno nominations announced on CBC radio, and included was Long John Baldry — who was newly resident in Canada but had already been in the music business for almost 20 years — as most promising vocalist.

They were renamed the CASBYs in 1985, after a listener contest. The 1985 ceremony, hosted by Carole Pope and Paul Shaffer, also marked the first time that the awards were broadcast nationally by CBC Television. In the first year, voter ballots were distributed exclusively by the Canadian music magazine Graffiti. In later years the awards expanded the distribution, printing ballots in a number of major market daily newspapers across Canada.

The 1987 ceremony featured a rare public performance by XTC, although their performance was videotaped in advance of the ceremony. That year's awards were also marred by several organizational snafus, including the wrong winner being initially announced for Album of the Year.

The award's bid for national prominence faltered in the late 1980s, particularly after CFNY's short-lived shift to a more mainstream music format also affected public perception of the awards' identity. During that era, some alienated listeners even picketed the awards ceremony. Beginning in 1993 the awards were pared down to just three categories, and after 1996, amid a sense that the awards had effectively lost their purpose, the awards were discontinued.

They were then revived in 2002, and were presented each year until 2017.

Winners

1980s

1981
 Album of the Year: Teenage Head, Frantic City
 Single of the Year: Martha and the Muffins, "Echo Beach"
 Group of the Year: Teenage Head
 Female Vocalist of the Year: Carole Pope (Rough Trade)
 Male Vocalist of the Year: B.B. Gabor

1982
 Album of the Year: Bruce Cockburn, Inner City Front
 Single of the Year: Blue Peter, "Chinese Graffiti"
 Group of the Year: Martha and the Muffins
 Female Vocalist of the Year: Carole Pope (Rough Trade)
 Male Vocalist of the Year: B.B. Gabor

1983
 Album of the Year: Rough Trade, Shaking the Foundations
 Single of the Year: The Payolas, "Eyes of a Stranger"
 Group of the Year: Spoons
 Female Vocalist of the Year: Carole Pope (Rough Trade)
 Male Vocalist of the Year: Leroy Sibbles

1984
 Album of the Year: Parachute Club, Parachute Club
 Single of the Year: Men Without Hats, "The Safety Dance"
 Group of the Year: Parachute Club
 Female Vocalist of the Year: Lorraine Segato (Parachute Club)
 Male Vocalist of the Year: Paul Humphrey (Blue Peter)

1985
 Album of the Year: Parachute Club, At the Feet of the Moon
 Single of the Year: Spoons, "Tell No Lies"
 Group of the Year: Parachute Club
 Female Vocalist of the Year: Jane Siberry
 Male Vocalist of the Year: Bruce Cockburn
 Most Promising Non-Recording Group: Chalk Circle
 Most Promising Group of the Year: Pukka Orchestra

1986
 Album of the Year: Jane Siberry, The Speckless Sky
 Single of the Year: Images in Vogue, "In the House"
 Group of the Year: Images in Vogue
 Female Vocalist of the Year: Luba
 Male Vocalist of the Year: Bruce Cockburn
 Most Promising Group: Chalk Circle
 International Album of the Year: Peter Gabriel, So

1987
 Album of the Year: Parachute Club, Small Victories
 Single of the Year: Luba, "How Many (Rivers To Cross)"
 Group of the Year: Parachute Club
 Female Vocalist of the Year: Luba
 Male Vocalist of the Year: Corey Hart
 Most Promising Group: The Pursuit of Happiness
 Best Non-Recording Act: Basic English
 International Album of the Year: Paul Simon, Graceland

1988
 Album of the Year: Robbie Robertson, Robbie Robertson
 Single of the Year: Blue Rodeo, "Try"
 Group of the Year: Blue Rodeo
 Female Vocalist of the Year: k.d. lang
 Male Vocalist of the Year: Robbie Robertson
 Most Promising Group: The Razorbacks (defeating The Tragically Hip)
 Most Promising Artist: Andrew Cash
 International Album of the Year: INXS, Kick
 Best R&B/Reggae Recording: Sattalites
 Best Jazz Recording: Manteca, Fire Me Up
 Producer of the Year: Daniel Lanois, Robbie Robertson 
 Video of the Year: Blue Rodeo, "Try"
 Best Independent Video: The Shuffle Demons - "Out of My House", "Roach"
 Best Independent Artist: The Shuffle Demons
 Best Album Art: The Grapes of Wrath, Treehouse

1989
 Album of the Year: Jeff Healey, See the Light
 Single of the Year: Jeff Healey, "Angel Eyes"
 Group of the Year: Blue Rodeo
 Female Vocalist of the Year: k.d. lang
 Male Vocalist of the Year: Jeff Healey
 Most Promising Group: Sons of Freedom
 International Album of the Year: Fine Young Cannibals, The Raw & the Cooked

1990s

1990
 Album of the Year: The Tragically Hip, Up to Here
 Single of the Year: The Tragically Hip, "New Orleans Is Sinking"
 Group of the Year: The Tragically Hip
 Female Vocalist of the Year: Margo Timmins (Cowboy Junkies)
 Male Vocalist of the Year: Gordon Downie (The Tragically Hip)
 Most Promising Group: Skydiggers
 International Album of the Year: Sinéad O'Connor, I Do Not Want What I Haven't Got

1991
 Favourite Album: Crash Test Dummies, The Ghosts That Haunt Me
 Favourite Song: Crash Test Dummies, "Superman's Song"
 Favourite Group/Artist: Barenaked Ladies
 Most Promising Female Vocalist: Sarah McLachlan
 Most Promising Male Vocalist: Brad Roberts (Crash Test Dummies)
 Next Big Thing: Bourbon Tabernacle Choir
 Most Outstanding Musician: Bruce Cockburn

1992
 Favourite Album: The Grapes of Wrath, These Days
 Favourite Song: The Grapes of Wrath, "I Am Here"
 Favourite Group/Artist: Barenaked Ladies
 Favourite Female Vocalist: Sarah McLachlan
 Favourite Male Vocalist: Gordon Downie (The Tragically Hip)
 Favourite Debut Album: Waltons, Lik My Trakter
 Special Achievement Award: Teenage Head

1993
 Favourite New Album: Pure, Pureafunalia
 Favourite New Song: 
 Favourite New Artist: Universal Honey

1994
Single of the Year: Doughboys, Shine
Favourite New Album:
 Favourite New Song: 
 Favourite New Artist: Treble Charger

1995
 Favourite New Album: Our Lady Peace, Naveed
 Favourite New Song: Our Lady Peace, "Naveed"
 Favourite New Artist: Our Lady Peace

1996
 Favourite New Album: I Mother Earth, Scenery and Fish
 Favourite New Song: I Mother Earth, "One More Astronaut"
 Favourite New Artist: Limblifter

2000s

2002

 Favourite New Artist: Sam Roberts
 Favourite New Single: Treble Charger, "Hundred Million"
 Favourite New Album: Our Lady Peace, Gravity
 Favourite New Video: Simple Plan, I'm Just a Kid
 Favourite New Indie Release: Not By Choice — Maybe One Day
 Lifetime Achievement Award: Rheostatics

2003

 Favourite New Artist: Three Days Grace
 Favourite New Single: Billy Talent, "Try Honesty"
 Favourite New Album: Sam Roberts, We Were Born in a Flame
 Favourite New Indie Release: The Salads, Fold A to B
 Lifetime Achievement Award: The Pursuit of Happiness

2004

 Favourite New Artist: The Trews
 Favourite New Single: Billy Talent, "River Below"
 Favourite New Album: Billy Talent, Billy Talent
 NXNE Favourite Indie Band: Alexisonfire

2005

 Favourite New Artist: Arcade Fire
 Favourite New Single: Bedouin Soundclash, "When the Night Feels My Song"
 Favourite New Album: Arcade Fire, Funeral
 NXNE Favourite New Indie Release: BOY, Every Page You Turn

2006

 Favourite New Artist: City and Colour
 Favourite New Single: Billy Talent, "Devil in a Midnight Mass"
 Favourite New Album: Billy Talent, Billy Talent II
 NXNE Favourite New Indie Release: Alexisonfire, Crisis

2007
 Favourite New Artist: Attack in Black
 Favourite New Single: Alexisonfire, "Boiled Frogs"
 Favourite New Album: Finger Eleven, Them vs. You vs. Me
 NXNE Favourite New Indie Release: Attack in Black, Marriage

2008
 Favourite New Artist: Ubiquitous Synergy Seeker
 Favourite New Single: Ubiquitous Synergy Seeker, "Hollow Point Sniper Hyperbole"
 Favourite New Album: Tokyo Police Club, Elephant Shell
 NXNE Favourite New Indie Release: City and Colour, Bring Me Your Love

2009
 Favourite New Artist: Arkells
 Favourite New Single: City and Colour, "Sleeping Sickness"
 Favourite New Album: Metric, Fantasies
 NXNE Favourite New Indie Release: Metric, Fantasies

2010
 Favourite New Album: Three Days Grace, Life Starts Now
 Favourite New Artist: Hollerado
 Favourite New Single: Alexisonfire, "The Northern"
 NXNE Favourite New Indie Release: Tokyo Police Club, Champ
 Favourite Edge Session: Silversun Pickups

2011

 Favourite New Album: The Sheepdogs, Learn & Burn
 Favourite New Artist: The Sheepdogs
 Favourite New Single: City and Colour, "Fragile Bird"
 NXNE Favourite New Indie Release: The Sheepdogs, Learn & Burn
 Favourite Edge Session: Mumford & Sons

2012

 Favourite New Album: Big Wreck, Albatross
 Favourite New Artist: Monster Truck
 Favourite New Single: Big Wreck, "Albatross"
 NXNE Favourite New Indie Release: Metric, Synthetica
 Favourite Edge Session: Metric

2013

 Favourite New Album: Mother Mother, The Sticks
 Favourite New Artist: Walk Off the Earth
 Favourite New Single: City and Colour, "Thirst"
 Favourite Sugar Beach Session: Hollerado

2014

 Favourite New Album: Arkells, High Noon
 Favourite New Artist: July Talk
 Favourite New Single: Ubiquitous Synergy Seeker, "Advanced Basics"
 Favourite Sugar Beach Session: City and Colour

2015

 Favourite New Record: Mother Mother, Very Good Bad Thing
 Molson Canadian Favourite New Artist: Coleman Hell
 Favourite New Song: Ubiquitous Synergy Seeker, "Shipwreck"
 Favourite Sugar Beach Session: Metric

2016

 Favourite New Record: Billy Talent, Afraid of Heights
 Molson Canadian Favourite New Artist: Banners
 Favourite New Song: July Talk, "Push + Pull" 
 Favourite Sugar Beach Session: Arkells

2017

 Favourite New Record: Mother Mother, No Culture
 Molson Canadian Favourite New Artist: Ascot Royals
 Favourite New Song: Arkells, "Knocking at the Door"
 Favourite Sugar Beach Session: Hollerado

References

External links
 Official site
 Archive of the 1987 CASBY program

Canadian music awards
Awards established in 1981
Awards disestablished in 2017